Eidsberg was a municipality in Østfold county, Norway. The administrative centre of the municipality was the town of Mysen. In 2020, Eidsberg was absorbed into the Indre Østfold municipality.

Eidsberg was established as a municipality on 1 January 1838 (see formannskapsdistrikt). The town of Mysen was separated from Eidsberg to form a municipality of its own on 1 July 1920, but it was merged back into the municipality of Eidsberg on 1 January 1961.

General information

Name 
The municipality (originally the parish) was named after the old Eidsberg farm (Old Norse: Eiðsberg) because the first church was built here. The first element is the genitive case of eið 'path around a waterfall' and the last element is berg 'mountain'. Prior to 1847, the name was spelled Edsberg.

Coat-of-arms 
The coat-of-arms was from modern times. It was granted on 16 March 1962. The arms show a bear, which is taken as a symbol for Arnbjørn Jonsson, who lived in Eidsberg. The bear is canting for Bjørn. He was a well-known warrior during the civil war era under King Håkon Håkonsson, until his death in 1240.

Minorities

Notable people

References

External links 
 
 
 
 Municipal fact sheet from Statistics Norway

 
Municipalities of Østfold